Microceratops may refer to:
 Microceratops Seyrig, 1952, an invalid junior synonym  of Neopimpla, an ichneumonid wasp genus
 Microceratops Bohlin, 1953, an invalid junior synonym of Microceratus, a ceratopsian genus